Anthony John Carss (born 31 March 1976) is an English football coach and former professional player, who currently works for Aston Villa Academy as a Under-21 Senior Professional Development Phase Coach.

Carss started his career with Blackburn Rovers, and went on to Darlington, Cardiff City, Chesterfield, Oldham Athletic and Huddersfield Town.

After retiring from playing in 2006, Carss has also coached at Huddersfield Town Academy and Blackburn Rovers F.C. Academy.

Career

Playing career 
Carss signed his first professional contract with Blackburn Rovers in 1994, after finishing an apprenticeship with Bradford City. However, his playing career was punctuated by injury, and he left Blackburn having never played a league game. After spells at Darlington, Cardiff City, Chesterfield, Carlisle United and Oldham Athletic – in 2003 Carss joined Huddersfield Town, winning promotion via the Division Three play off final in 2004. And scoring a goal that some have said was one of the best goals in Huddersfield's history in a league game against Torquay United on 11 October 2003.

Coaching career 
After being released by Huddersfield, Carss called an end to his playing career, expressing a desire to one day become a coach. However, he initially retrained to become a sports journalist, stating that his goal was still to try to transition into coaching, but that this was another way to stay in the football industry. He graduated from Staffordshire University with a degree in Professional Sports Writing and Broadcasting in summer of 2008.

At the same time, Carss worked as a coach for Huddersfield Town U18s. In 2017, Carss moved to Blackburn Rovers to take the role as their Head of Coaching. In June 2018, Carss achieved his UEFA Pro Licence, graduating alongside Nemanja Vidić, David James and Nicky Butt.

On 14 June 2022, Blackburn Rovers announced that Carss would leave his role later in that month, in order to take up a role at a Premier League club which was later announced to be the role of Aston Villa F.C. Under-21s manager.

Honours

As a player
Darlington
Football League Division Three Play-Off Final runner-up: 1995–96

Huddersfield Town
Football League Division Three Play-Off Final winner: 2003–04

References

External links

1976 births
Living people
People from Alnwick
Footballers from Northumberland
English footballers
Blackburn Rovers F.C. players
Darlington F.C. players
Cardiff City F.C. players
Chesterfield F.C. players
Carlisle United F.C. players
Oldham Athletic A.F.C. players
Huddersfield Town A.F.C. players
Huddersfield Town A.F.C. non-playing staff
English Football League players
Alumni of Staffordshire University
Association football midfielders
Blackburn Rovers F.C. non-playing staff
Aston Villa F.C. non-playing staff
Association football coaches